Nangal Bhim is a small village situated in Sikar District of Rajasthan state of India. This village is situated near Shrimadhopur city.

Villages in Sikar district